Hipnosis is a studio album by saxophonist Jackie McLean, featuring selections recorded for Blue Note Records in the 1960s, but not released until 1978. The album was released in the US as a two-fer (BN-LA 483-H2), which included five tracks from a 1967 session, plus six tracks recorded in 1962 later appeared on the CD reissue of Vertigo (see #6-11). In Japan, it was released the same year as a standard LP (ST-83022) with a different cover, featuring only the 1967 tracks.

Track listing 
Japanese release
"Hipnosis" (Moncur III) - 11:19
"Slow Poke" (McLean) - 7:49
"The Breakout" (McLean) - 6:29
"Back Home" (Moncur III) - 6:05
"The Reason Why" (LaMont Johnson) - 6:53

US release
"The Three Minors" (McLean) - 6:05
"Blues in a Jiff" (Clark) - 7:12
"Blues for Jackie" (Kenny Dorham) - 7:53
"Marilyn's Dilemma" (Billy Higgins) - 5:03
"Iddy Bitty" (McLean) - 8:17
"The Way I Feel" (Butch Warren) - 7:05
"Hipnosis" (Moncur III) - 11:19
"Slow Poke" (McLean) - 7:49
"The Breakout" (McLean) - 6:29
"Back Home" (Moncur III) - 6:05
"The Reason Why" (LaMont Johnson) - 6:53

Recorded on June 14, 1962 (#1-6) and February 3, 1967 (#7-11).

Personnel
Tracks 1-6
Jackie McLean - alto saxophone
Kenny Dorham - trumpet
Sonny Clark - piano
Butch Warren - bass
Billy Higgins - drums

Tracks 7-11
Jackie McLean - alto saxophone
Grachan Moncur III - trombone
LaMont Johnson - piano
Scotty Holt - bass
Billy Higgins - drums

References 

1978 albums
Jackie McLean albums
Albums produced by Alfred Lion
Blue Note Records albums